The 1995 Memphis Pharaohs season was the first season for the Memphis Pharaohs. They finished the 1995 Arena Football League season 6–6 and ended the season with a loss in the quarterfinals of the playoffs against the Tampa Bay Storm.

Schedule

Regular season

Playoffs
The Pharaohs were awarded the No. 8 seed in the AFL playoffs.

Standings

Awards

References

Oklahoma Wranglers seasons
1995 Arena Football League season
Memphis Pharaohs Season, 1995